Greenwood, Nova Scotia may refer to:

 Greenwood, Halifax County, Nova Scotia, a rural community
 Greenwood, Nova Scotia, a village in Kings County
 Greenwood, Shelburne, Nova Scotia, a rural community in Shelburne County
 Greenwood, Pictou, Nova Scotia, a rural community in Pictou County
 Greenwood Heights, Nova Scotia, a neighbourhood  of Timberlea, Halifax
 Greenwood Lake a lake in the Guysborough, Nova Scotia
 Greenwood Square, a rural community in Kings County
 CFB Greenwood, a Canadian Forces Base in Kings County